Khanpur is a village in Ghazipur district, Uttar Pradesh, India. It situated 30 km north-east from Varanasi, 45 km west from Ghazipur, 56 km east from Jaunpur, and 80 km south from Azamgarh.

There are six villages in the local self-government (gram panchayat) area of Khanpur, being Khanpur Bairahia, Khanpur Nonara, Khanpur Basti(Chamaruti, Khanpur Emirti, Khanpur Dih, and Khanpur Usarahan. The nearest railway station is at Aunrihar, 7 km away and there is a direct bus connection to Varanasi. There is also a hospital.

There are temples to several gods, including Goria dih, Jamaki Dih, Kali, Durga, Shiva, Hanuman, Krishna, and Ram.

References 

Villages in Ghazipur district